Costante Tencalla (1593, Bissone - 1646, Warsaw) was a Swiss-Italian architect and sculptor.

Life
He trained in Rome and spent his early working life there before going to Poland with his uncle Matteo Castelli, who became Poland's first royal architect. On Castelli's death he moved back to Italy to work on buildings in Bissone and Lugano. He then returned to Warsaw as architect to Władysław IV Vasa, who commissioned important buildings from him in Warsaw, Kraków, Leopoli, Gniezno, and Vilnius (Grand Duchy of Lithuania).

References

17th-century architects
Swiss sculptors
Swiss architects
1593 births
1646 deaths
Swiss people of Italian descent
People from Lugano
Architects from Ticino